A festoon is a wreath or garland hanging from two points.

Festoon may also refer to:

 Festoon (horse), a racehorse
 Festoon (moth)
 Festoon (bulb), an automotive light bulb type